Robert Youds (born 1954) is a Canadian artist based in Victoria, British Columbia.

Life
Robert Youds was born in 1954 in Burnaby, British Columbia.With Light: Robert Youds
"Since the 1980s, Robert Youds has conducted a singular investigation of the material conditions of the pictorial—a path that has led him from paintings with cut-out apertures through stretched lines of colour made of strands of latex and velvet cushions bound with ropes through to his recent constructions incorporating fluorescent, neon and LED lights".Barry Schwabsky.
 He holds an MFA from York University and a BFA from the University of Victoria.

Exhibitions
Youds' solo exhibitions include:
2017   For Everyone a Fountain, Open Space, Victoria, BC, 
2015   Say nothing, twice, Diaz Contemporary, Toronto, ON,
2014 - 2015   For Everyone a Sunset, Vancouver Art Gallery OffSite, Vancouver, BC 
2002   Chicago International Art Fair, Feature exhibit, Post Gallery, Los Angeles, CA
2002   Post Gallery, Los Angeles, CA
1995   Forse Che Si, Forse Che No, The Power Plant, curated by Greg Bellerby, catalogue essay by Willard Holmes

  Jesus Green Tofino Sunset at Diaz Contemporary in Toronto 
 beautiful beautiful artificial field at the Art Gallery of Greater Victoria

Selected group shows include: 
2019    Garden in the Machine, Surrey Art Gallery, Surrey, BC 
2015   The Transformation of Landscape Art in Canada: The Inside and Outside of Being, Today Art Museum, Beijing, China, 
2013   Rewilding Modernity, Mendel Art Gallery, Saskatoon, SK 
2000   spilled edge soft corners, Galerie Christiane Chassay, Montreal, curated by Barbara Fischer   
1999   Five Continents and One City, Museum of Mexico City, Mexico
1999   Les Peintures, Galerie Rene Blouin, Montreal, QC
1999   Postmark: An Abstract Effect, Site Santa Fe, Santa Fe, NM 
1999   twistfoldlayerflake, Oliver Art Center, CCAC Institute, Oakland, CA
1997   L.A. International, Biennial Art Invitational, Post Gallery, CA
1996   Topographies, aspects of recent B.C. art, Vancouver Art Gallery, Vancouver, BC  
 
  The Shape of Colour: Excursions in Colour Field Art 1950-2005 at the Art Gallery of Ontario.

Collections
Robert Youds' work is included in the permanent collections of the National Gallery of Canada and the Vancouver Art Gallery.

References

External links 
 Official site

Artists from British Columbia
Living people
1954 births
People from Burnaby
University of Victoria alumni
Academic staff of the University of Victoria
York University alumni